The  1955 Campeonato Argentino de Rugby was won by the selection of Capital that beat in the final the selection of Buenos Aires Province ("Provincia").

Rugby Union in Argentina in 1955
 The "Buenos Aires Champsionship" was won by Club Atlético San Isidro
 The "Cordoba Province Championship" was won by Córdoba Athletic Club
 The "North-East Championship" was won by Natación y Gimnasia

Knock out stages 
The championship suffer a lot of trouble due to the political situazion in the country with the deposing of Juan Domingo Perón during the Revolución Libertadora.

The selection of Río Paranà didn't participate and the selection of San Juan withdraws from Quarters of finals after the delay of the match scheduled for 19 September, refusing to play on 2 October.

Final

Bibliography 
  Memorias de la UAR 1955
  XI Campeonato Argentino

Campeonato Argentino de Rugby
Argentina
Campeonato